Zwagg Island, also known as Grand Island, is a non-populated island near Brookings in Curry County, Oregon,  United States.

A 1988 report by the United States Geological Survey found no resources on the island.

Zwagg Island was named after Folker Von Der Zwaag, an 1889 Oregon pioneer born in the Netherlands. Von Der Zwaag lived a hermit life on the island with his dog, Sniff.

References 

Pacific islands of Oregon
Landforms of Curry County, Oregon
Uninhabited islands of Oregon